"Energy" is the debut solo single by American recording artist Keri Hilson. The song was written and produced by the Runaways, consisting of Louis Biancaniello, Sam Watters, Rico Love, and Wayne Wilkins, for her studio album In a Perfect World… (2009).

The track was released as the first single from the singer's debut in the United States on May 27, 2008. Although being released worldwide it initially only charted in New Zealand at number two and only managed to reach top thirty on the U.S. Billboard Hot R&B/Hip-Hop Songs and Hot Dance Club Play charts.

Generally well received by music critics, it was named sixty-first on the Top 144 Songs of 2008 listing by Blender magazine.

Background
"Energy" was written and produced by the Runaways. It was also recorded by the Runaways at Homesite 13 studios in Novato, California. and Hilson stated that she wanted to prove that she can be successful even without collaborations and guest vocalists and so it was announced "Energy" would be released as the next worldwide single following the success of "Knock You Down". The song was released on September 14, 2009 in the UK. On September 25, 2009 she appeared live on breakfast TV show GMTV in the UK where she performed the single. That same day, she appeared on BBC Radio 1's Live Lounge where she performed a stripped version of "Energy" as well as a gospel cover version of "Supernova" originally sung by Mr Hudson and Kanye West.

Music video
The music video for "Energy" was directed by Melina Matsoukas and produced by Wohn Winter. Set primarily in a boxing ring, Hilson plays a boxer whose love interest (played by Christian Keyes) is her apparent trainer. Hilson explains that her character continually tries to sort their broken relationship, but by the end of the video, she realizes that it's just not working. Throughout the video, there are cutaways in which Hilson argues with her boyfriend in their apartment, Hilson working out, having recently worked out and now in locker room, singing against a wall, and singing in a hallway.

Trivia
In the video, there was appearance of the replica Winged Eagle WWE Championship on her waist while sitting on a stool in the corner of the boxing ring, where viewers think it was a boxing championship belt. The song was also used as a sample for, American Rapper, Real Dynamite, single "I'm Energized".

Chart performance
In Australia, "Energy" peaked at number 55 on the Singles chart and number 19 on the Urban Singles chart. In New Zealand, the song peaked at number two, and was certified Gold on November 30, 2008, selling over 7,500 copies.

Track listings

US promo CD
"Energy" (Main version) – 3:30
"Energy" (Instrumental) – 3:30
"Energy" (Acappella) – 3:17

International CD
"Energy" (Radio Edit) – 3:28
"Energy" (Wideboys Radio Mix) – 3:04

International maxi CD / download bundle
"Energy" (The Demolition Crew Remix) — 3:03
"Energy" (DJ Q Remix) — 4:23
"Energy" (Instrumental) — 3:29
"Energy" (Acapella) — 3:16

Official Versions
"Energy" (Main Version) – 3:30
"Energy" (Instrumental) – 3:30
"Energy" (Radio Edit) – 3:28
"Energy" (Acappella) – 3:17
"Energy" (Wideboys radio mix) – 3:04
"Energy" (Wideboys club mix) – 6:35
"Energy" (The Demolition Crew Remix) — 3:03
"Energy" (DJ Q Remix) — 4:23
"Energy" (Russ Castella Remix) – 3:35

Personnel
Credits adapted from the In the Perfect World... liner notes.
The Runaways – producer, engineer, recording, mixing
Ravaughn Brown – additional vocals
Dru Castro – additional recording

Charts

Weekly charts

Year-end charts

Certifications

Release history

References

External links
 KeriHilsonMusic.com — official site

2009 singles
2008 debut singles
Contemporary R&B ballads
Keri Hilson songs
Music videos directed by Melina Matsoukas
Songs written by Louis Biancaniello
Songs written by Wayne Wilkins
Songs written by Sam Watters
Songs written by Rico Love
2008 songs
Mosley Music Group singles